Alberto Federico 'Beto' Acosta Tabizzi (born 23 August 1966) is an Argentine retired footballer who played as a striker.

In a professional career which spanned 18 years (nearly 700 official games and more than 250 goals), he played for San Lorenzo in four different spells. Additionally, he represented clubs in France, Chile, Japan and Portugal.

Acosta appeared with Argentina in two Copa América tournaments.

Club career
Born in Arocena, Santa Fe Province, Acosta started playing professionally at Unión de Santa Fe, making his top division debut one month shy of his 20th birthday, in a 0–0 home draw against Argentinos Juniors. Two years later he transferred to San Lorenzo de Almagro, scoring 34 goals in his first two seasons combined, that being the first of the four spells with the club in an 18-year career.

In 1990 Acosta had his first abroad experience, with France's Toulouse FC. After a poor second season he left in December 1991, having played in seven matches with just one goal, with the club eventually ranking 16th – he returned to San Lorenzo, where he scored a further 19 league goals, which earned him a transfer to country giants Boca Juniors.

Acosta spent the following three years out of Argentina, starting and ending with Club Deportivo Universidad Católica in Chile where he rejoined former San Lorenzo teammate Néstor Gorosito. In 1994, he was crowned the top scorer in South American football, netting 33 times in only 25 matches. Also during that debut campaign, he was unable to further help the team for five matches (four after assaulting C.F. Universidad de Chile's Luis Musrri); in between his spell with Universidad, he played in the J1 League for Yokohama Marinos.

In December 1998, Acosta signed with Sporting Clube de Portugal. In his first full season, the 33-year-old striker scored 22 goals, helping the Lisbon side to the Primeira Liga championship after an 18-year wait. He added 14 the following campaign, but was deemed surplus to requirements after the signing of Mário Jardel, and returned to San Lorenzo for the fourth and last time, netting always in double digits until his 2004 retirement at the age of 37. Although still physically fit, the scorer of 300 goals in 666 official games opted to retire, instead of being coerced into retirement later on.

Acosta kickstarted his managerial career in Romania, with FCM Dunărea Galaţi. In the 2007 summer he returned to his country, joining fourth division team Club Atlético Fénix's coaching staff and coming out of retirement for a few months.

International career
Having collected 19 caps for Argentina during three years, Acosta represented the nation in two Copa América tournaments. In the 1993 edition in Ecuador, he converted his penalty shootout attempts in both the quarter-finals and the semifinals, as the nation eventually emerged victorious.

Career statistics

Club

International

Honours

Club
Universidad Católica
Copa Chile: 1995
Chilean Primera División: Apertura 1997
Copa Interamericana: 1993

Sporting
Primeira Liga: 1999–2000
Supertaça Cândido de Oliveira: 2000

San Lorenzo
Copa Sudamericana: 2002
Copa Mercosur: 2001

International
Argentina
Kirin Cup: 1992
FIFA Confederations Cup: 1992
Copa América: 1993
Artemio Franchi Cup: 1993

Individual
Argentine Primera División Top scorer: Apertura 1992 (12 goals)
Chilean Primera División Player of the Year: 1994
Chilean Primera División Top scorer: 1994 (33 goals)
Copa Chile Top scorer: 1995 (10 goals)
Copa Libertadores Top scorer: 1997 (11 goals)
Francisco Stromp Award: 2000

References

External links

Stats at FutbolPasion 

1966 births
Living people
People from San Jerónimo Department
Association football forwards
Argentine Primera División players
Unión de Santa Fe footballers
San Lorenzo de Almagro footballers
Boca Juniors footballers
Club Atlético Fénix players
Ligue 1 players
Toulouse FC players
Chilean Primera División players
Club Deportivo Universidad Católica footballers
J1 League players
Yokohama F. Marinos players
Primeira Liga players
Sporting CP footballers
Argentina international footballers
1992 King Fahd Cup players
1993 Copa América players
1995 Copa América players
FIFA Confederations Cup-winning players
Copa América-winning players
Argentine beach soccer players
Argentine expatriate footballers
Argentine footballers
Expatriate footballers in France
Expatriate footballers in Chile
Expatriate footballers in Japan
Expatriate footballers in Portugal
Argentine expatriate sportspeople in France
Argentine expatriate sportspeople in Chile
Argentine expatriate sportspeople in Portugal
Argentine expatriate sportspeople in Japan
Argentine football managers
Sportspeople from Santa Fe Province